Jed Z. Buchwald is Doris and Henry Dreyfuss Professor of History at Caltech. He was previously director of the Dibner Institute for the History of Science and Technology at MIT. He won a MacArthur Fellowship in 1995 and was elected to the American Philosophical Society in 2011.

Buchwald graduated from Harvard University with a PhD in 1974. His dissertation was entitled Matter, the Medium, and the Electrical Current: A History of Electricity and Magnetism from 1842 to 1895.

Works 
Buchwald's publications include several full books and edited history-of-science essay collections:

 1985 – From Maxwell to Microphysics: Aspects of Electromagnetic Theory in the Last Quarter of the Nineteenth Century
 1989 – The Rise of the Wave Theory of Light: Optical Theory and Experiment in the Early Nineteenth Century
 1993 – Einstein Papers Project Vol. 3 (one of nine contributing editors)
 1994 – The Creation of Scientific Effects: Heinrich Hertz and electric waves
 1995 – Scientific Practice: Theories and Stories of Doing Physics (editor)
 1996 – Scientific Credibility and Technical Standards in 19th and Early 20th Century Germany and Britain (editor)
 2000 – Isaac Newton's Natural Philosophy (editor, with I. Bernard Cohen)
 2001 – Histories of the Electron: The Birth of Microphysics (editor, with Andrew Warwick)
 2005 – Wrong for the Right Reasons (editor, with Allan Franklin)
 2010 – The Zodiac of Paris: How an Improbable Controversy Over an Ancient Egyptian Artifact Provoked a Modern Debate Over Religion and Science (with Diane Greco Josefowicz)
 2012 – Newton and the Origin of Civilization (with Mordechai Feingold)
 2020 – The Riddle of the Rosetta: How an English Polymath and a French Polyglot Discovered the Meaning of Egyptian Hieroglyphs (with Diane Greco Josefowicz)

Buchwald is also the general editor of the book series Dibner Institute Studies in the History of Science and Technology and of the book series Archimedes: New Studies in the History and Philosophy of Science and Technology, as well as managing editor of the book series Sources and Studies in the History of Mathematics and the Physical Sciences. Buchwald, together with Jeremy Gray, serves as editor-in-chief of the Springer journal Archive for History of Exact Sciences.

Personal life 
Buchwald's wife Diana Kormos Buchwald is the director of the Einstein Papers Project at Caltech.

References

External links
 Buchwald's home page at Caltech's Division of the Humanities and Social Sciences
 Oral history interview transcript for Jed Buchwald on 29 July 2020, American Institute of Physics, Niels Bohr Library & Archives
 Newton's Dark Secrets, NOVA show on which Buchwald is one of the historians discussing Newton's life and work

American historians of science
Harvard University alumni
Massachusetts Institute of Technology faculty
Buchwald, Jed Z.
Buchwald, Jed Z.
California Institute of Technology faculty
MacArthur Fellows
Place of birth missing (living people)
21st-century American historians
21st-century American male writers
American male non-fiction writers